Swen Schulz (born 1 March 1968) is a German politician of the Social Democratic Party (SPD) who served as a member of the Bundestag from the state of Berlin from 2002 until 2021.

Political career 
Schulz became a member of the Bundestag after the 2002 German federal election. From 2002 until 2013, he served on the Committee for Education, Research and Technology Assessment.

In the negotiations to form a Grand Coalition of Chancellor Angela Merkel's Christian Democrats and the SPD following the 2013 federal elections, Schulz was part of the SPD delegation in the working group on education and research policy, led by Johanna Wanka and Doris Ahnen. From 2014 until 2021, he was a member of the Budget Committee. In this capacity, he served as his parliamentary group's rapporteur on the annual budget of the Federal Ministry of Education and Research.

In 2018, Schulz announced that he would not stand in the 2021 federal elections but instead resign from active politics by the end of the parliamentary term.

Other activities 
 Leibniz Association, Member of the Senate (since 2021)
 Association of German Foundations, Member of the Parliamentary Advisory Board
 Berlin Social Science Center (WZB), Member of the Board of Trustees
 Ernst Reuter Foundation for Advanced Study, Member of the Board of Trustees
 University of Hagen, Member of the Parliamentary Advisory Board
 Gegen Vergessen – Für Demokratie, Member
 Humanist Association of Germany (HVD), Member

References

External links 

  
 Bundestag biography 

1968 births
Living people
Members of the Bundestag for Berlin
Members of the Bundestag 2017–2021
Members of the Bundestag 2013–2017
Members of the Bundestag 2009–2013
Members of the Bundestag 2005–2009
Members of the Bundestag 2002–2005
Members of the Bundestag 1998–2002
Members of the Bundestag for the Social Democratic Party of Germany
20th-century births